The Harischandra Range is a group of hills in the state of Maharashtra, India. It lies in the northwestern region of the Deccan Plateau, between the Godavari and the Bhima rivers. These are low-lying hills with an average elevation of about 600 metres, and they lose elevation in the southeastern direction. The Kalsubai is the highest peak. The Harishchandragad is another important peak. The range is thought to have been formed as a result of the downward erosion of the basaltic Deccan Plateau by the Godavari and Bhima rivers. In the northwest, the range merges with the Western Ghats.

The vegetation consists of deciduous forests, especially teak. Ahmednagar is the important city of this region, and the hills lie between Ahmednagar and Pune.

References 

Hills of Maharashtra
Erosion landforms